Brian Kolfage is a veteran of the United States Air Force and the founder of the organization We Build the Wall, which began construction of a privately funded barrier on the U.S.–Mexico border after raising more than $25 million through GoFundMe donations. Kolfage is a triple amputee who suffered injuries while serving in Iraq with the U.S. Air Force.

In December 2018, Kolfage initiated a fundraising campaign ostensibly for U.S. President Donald Trump's proposed Mexico–United States barrier on GoFundMe under the organizational title of "We Build the Wall, Inc." Over the 2019 Memorial Day weekend, the organization constructed a  "weathered steel" bollard fence near El Paso on private land adjoining the U.S.–Mexico border using $6–8 million of the donated funds. The organization ultimately raised $25 million, much of it from online crowdfunding. It claimed that it planned to construct further barriers on private lands adjoining the border with Mexico in Texas and California.

In August 2020, Kolfage was indicted, along with Steve Bannon and two other co-defendants, on federal charges of defrauding hundreds of thousands of "We Build the Wall" donors by diverting money that was raised to personal use. Federal prosecutors said that despite "repeatedly assuring donors" that Kolfage would not be paid, the defendants engaged in a scheme to divert $350,000 to Kolfage, "which he used to fund his lavish lifestyle." Kolfage was separately indicted in May 2021 on federal charges of defrauding the IRS and filing false tax returns.

Military service and education 
Kolfage was deployed to Kuwait in 2003 and 2004, where he served in the U.S. Air Force Security Forces. In 2004, he volunteered to go to Iraq, but was not chosen. Another volunteer backed out at the last minute, and Kolfage went to Iraq as an air-cargo inspector. He was injured in Balad, on September 11, 2004, after leaving his quarters and a missile exploded three feet away. He lost both legs, as well as his right hand and part of his right forearm, and a collapsed left lung.

Kolfage received a Purple Heart after being injured. He was hospitalized in Walter Reed Medical Center until July 2005.

After his injury he began to speak publicly about his experience and recovery. He filmed a campaign ad for Representative Gabrielle Giffords. He was invited as Giffords's special guest to President Obama's State of the Union address in 2012.

Kolfage enrolled in the University of Arizona in 2009, and graduated from its School of Architecture in 2014.

Causes

We Build the Wall, Inc. 

In December 2018, Kolfage started an attempt to raise $1 billion via GoFundMe for the construction of a border wall between the United States and Mexico. Kolfage said the target figure was achievable, adding "This won't be easy, but it's our duty as citizens." In an email to the Washington Post, Kolfage stated that he began the fundraiser as "political games from both parties" have been holding back funding for the wall. Within three days, over $9 million had been raised.

In January 2019, Kolfage posted a message to the GoFundMe page that he had decided that raising money through a nonprofit would be more successful. A new 501(c)4 non-profit was created and called We Build The Wall Inc. through which Kolfage planned to have segments of the wall privately constructed through negotiations with landowners along the border. Funding was passed through an LLC operated by Timothy Shea of Castle Rock, Colorado. The organization saw prominent politicians such as former Kansas Secretary of State Kris Kobach and Donald Trump advisor Steve Bannon take on leading roles. It began construction on a section of the proposed wall.

Kobach's involvement with the "We Build the Wall" 501(c)(4) organization raised concerns, as the fundraising and campaign mailing lists it was accumulating were prohibited from coordinating with his U.S. Senate campaign.

On July 23, 2019, Kansas Senate President Susan Wagle of Wichita filed the paperwork with the Federal Elections Commission necessary to run in the race for the U.S. Senate seat being vacated by the retiring Senator Pat Roberts. She criticized Kobach's employment in his controversial privately financed and constructed scheme to build the southern border wall. Wagle supports the building of a federally designed, bid, and funded wall while saying Kobach's group undermines federal involvement. "We don’t need some rogue organization going out and building the wall."

On August 1, 2019, Kobach sent out a campaign fundraiser using both the corporate name and email list of "Wall" donors. Common Cause Vice President for policy and litigation Paul S. Ryan said, "At a minimum, this Kobach for Senate fundraising solicitation email appears to violate the 'paid for by' disclaimer requirement" for official campaign communications. Ryan highlighted the requirement that mandates disclosure of the financial sponsors who originate official political communications. Kobach's email might be legal if his campaign paid fair market value for use of the list. If that were the case, a "paid for by" disclaimer would be required but was not present in the solicitation. Ryan said, "If the Kobach committee did not pay fair market value for the cost of disseminating this email, then the committee has arguably committed the more serious campaign finance law violation of receiving a corporate contribution in the form of a coordinated expenditure." We Build The Wall is legally prohibited from financing federal political campaigns in any fashion. Besides the concerns raised about Kolfage himself, a week prior to the mailer, right-wing anti-immigrant, "Wall" board member and former congressman Tom Tancredo sat on the stage alongside Kobach and endorsed him in a New Mexico rally pushing the Wall.

America First Medical 
In February 2020, Kolfage started medical-equipment company America First Medical amid growing alarm about COVID-19-related personal-protective-equipment (PPE) shortages. He told Reuters News Service he would broker large-volume sales of N95 masks, and collect up to three percent of every total sale. AFM's masks, Kolfage said, would come from N95 stockpiles he'd found around the world. He did not explain where the alleged stockpiles were located, nor how he found them.

In March 2020, Kolfage ordered a total of 25 million masks for America First Medical from MAMS Global Trading House (a manufacturer and distributor of power tools and safety equipment based in Dubai). The first order was for 10 million masks, for a total of $1.5 million. According to documents detailing the transaction, AFM agreed to wire half of the money ($750,000) up front, and the rest when the masks were delivered.

The deal was not successfully concluded. MAMS' CEO said before the company received payment, Kolfage disputed the transaction with his bank and reported the company as fraudulent to Dubai police. Kolfage also asked his bank to place the $750,000 in his personal account instead of the AFM account. The bank denied the request.

The AFM bank account was seized in mid-2020, when Kolfage was indicted in connection with the "We Build The Wall" enterprise.

Websites, fundraising campaigns 
By 2013, Kolfage began to spread conspiracy theories on social media; in a Facebook post, he referred to President Barack Obama as "a halfbreed."

In 2015, Kolfage ramped up his online presence with conservative-leaning websites. Many of the sites he either owned or was associated with were heavily promoted on Facebook and featured so-called clickbait articles: Freedom Daily; Keep America First; Right Wing News; Trump Republic; and VeteranAF. He also began writing articles for website The Blaze. Kolfage repeatedly denied owning Freedom Daily, but NBC News reported in 2019 that "former employees and competitors, most of whom asked for anonymity out of fear of retribution, provided company emails, employment documents and company checks that show Kolfage’s home address as Freedom Daily's corporate business address."

In addition to his Facebook pages and websites, Kolfage also ran many online fundraising campaigns. Through his border-wall campaign, Kolfage claimed to have amassed 3.5 million email addresses as well as phone numbers and names, a formidable asset in support of pro-Trump efforts. In 2019, NBC News reported that "according to former employees and public records including website archives, Nevada business registrations, and property records, Kolfage has repeatedly created GoFundMe campaigns and published inflammatory fake news articles, pushing them both from websites that he sought to hide behind shell companies and false identities, in part to harvest email addresses" which were "then used to push people back to Kolfage’s websites, to sell a brand of coffee he owns, or to be stockpiled for future use by conservative campaigns." During the 2020 political campaigns, Kolfage reportedly offered his list to a Republican fundraising consultant, proposing to keep half of any revenue the list generated.

Social media activity and Facebook suspensions 
In October 2018, all of Kolfage's Facebook news pages - as well as his "Military Grade Coffee" page - were taken down as part of Facebook's purge of spam and "inauthentic activity" sites. Facebook cited Kolfage's creation of multiple fake accounts and posting of "ad farms" links.

Kolfage has frequently used social media to personally attack detractors and promote misinformation against those he perceives as opponents, including progressives, fellow veterans, and former conservative allies. Kolfage's vilification of his critics on social media has led to his followers targeting the critics with invective, harassment, and death threats. After a Catholic priest of the La Lomita Chapel (a historic Catholic site whose land was threatened by the wall) opposed the project, Kolfage smeared him as a promoter of "human trafficking and abuse of women and children." Other social media targets of Kolfage included the National Butterfly Center, which is located adjacent to a border fence constructed in the Rio Grande Valley. In 2019, Kolfage posted 30 tweets attacking the butterfly center, attacking it as "left-wing thugs with a sham butterfly agenda" and accusing the center of supporting "illegal immigration and sex trafficking of women and children." At other points, Kolfage lashed out at the International Boundary and Water Commission and the mayor of Sunland Park, New Mexico, blaming the latter for moving too slowly to grant border-wall permits. In one case, Kolfage's activities on social media activity forced him to issue (in 2015) a formal apology as part of a settlement of civil litigation in the U.S. District Court for the District of Arizona over alleged disparagement.

Kolfage closed his Twitter feed after he was indicted on federal charges, but in September 2020, he re-launched his account to promote his claim that the criminal prosecution against him is a politically motivated "witch hunt." Kolfage's social media rants prompted federal prosecutors to complain that Kolfage's statements had "the potential to taint a future jury pool." A federal judge issued a warning to Kolfage but declined to issue a gag order.

Arrest, criminal charges and guilty plea

Federal criminal charges
On August 20, 2020, Kolfage was indicted and arrested along with Steve Bannon and two other co-defendants (Andrew Badolato and Timothy Shea) on charges of defrauding donors to build a border wall along the Mexico–U.S. border and funneling the money for their own personal use; the case is pending in New York federal court. While Donald Trump issued a pardon to Bannon in the final hours of his presidency (before the case could come to trial), Trump did not pardon Kolfage or the other two indicted defendants. Because Bannon was pardoned, his ability to invoke his Fifth Amendment right against self-incrimination could be curtailed, meaning that Bannon could be called as a witness against his three former co-defendants, including Kolfage.

In early May 2021, Kolfage was separately indicted by a grand jury in federal court in Pensacola, Florida on charges of fraud and filing false tax returns. The indictment charges Kolfage with knowingly underreporting his income to the IRS—specifically, by claiming an income of $63,000 in his 2019 tax return while failing to report more than $350,000 deposited into his personal bank account from "We Build the Wall" contributors and other sources."

On April 21, 2022, Kolfage entered a plea of guilty to charges of conspiracy to commit wire fraud, conspiracy to commit money laundering, and wire fraud in connection to filing a false tax return.

As of 14 Feb 2023, the SDNY is planning sentencing for Kolfage, Badolato and Shea on April 26, 2023 at 11am in front of Judge Analisa Torres.

Personal life
He graduated in 1999 from Kaimuki High School in Honolulu, Hawaii. He met his first wife, Paige (née Grounds), while her father was stationed in Hawaii. When Paige's family was transferred to Texas, Kolfage followed and enlisted in the US Air Force; he lived with Paige's grandparents while completing basic training at Lackland Air Force Base in San Antonio, Texas. Brian and Paige married in 2004 at Walter Reed National Military Medical Center, during his recovery from his military-service injuries.

During his time at Goodfellow, he met his current wife, Ashley (née Goetz), whom he married in 2011. They live in Miramar Beach, Florida.

References 

People from Hawaii
Living people
United States Air Force airmen
American amputees
People charged with fraud
United States Air Force personnel of the Iraq War
Year of birth missing (living people)